The 1976 Tasmanian state election was held on 11 December 1976  in the Australian state of Tasmania to elect 35 members of the Tasmanian House of Assembly. The election used the Hare-Clark proportional representation system — seven members were elected from each of five electorates.

The incumbent Labor Party, led by Bill Neilson, won a second term against the opposition Liberal Party, led by Max Bingham.

Background
Labor had won the 1972 election, by a landslide margin of 7 seats, with Labor leader Eric Reece elected as Premier of Tasmania for the second time. Reece retired from Parliament on 31 March 1975, after the ALP introduced a mandatory retirement age of 65. Liberal Party leader Angus Bethune retired three months later, and was replaced by Max Bingham.

Results

Labor won the election, although their majority was reduced to one seat.

|}

Distribution of votes

Primary vote by division

Distribution of seats

See also
 Members of the Tasmanian House of Assembly, 1976–1979
 Candidates of the 1976 Tasmanian state election

References

Elections in Tasmania
1976 elections in Australia
1970s in Tasmania
December 1976 events in Australia